The Yalbugha Mosque (Jāmi‘ Yalbuḡā) was a 13th-century mosque on the Barada river in Damascus, Syria. It was built by the Mamluks in 1264 or by Yalbughā al-Yahyāwī in 1346–47. During the reign of Ibrahim Pasha (1832–1840) it was converted to use as a biscuit factory. It was demolished in 1974 to make way for a redevelopment. A modern mosque completed on 27 October 2014 stands on the site.

References

Mosques completed in 1264
13th-century mosques
Mamluk mosques in Syria
Mosques in Damascus
Buildings and structures demolished in 1974
Demolished buildings and structures in Syria